The 2000 United States Senate election in Michigan was held on November 7, 2000. Incumbent Republican U.S. Senator Spencer Abraham ran for re-election to a second term, but he was narrowly defeated by his Democratic opponent, congresswoman Debbie Stabenow. Stabenow subsequently made history as the first woman to represent Michigan in the United States Senate. By a margin of 1.6%, this election was the second-closest race of the 2000 Senate election cycle, behind only the election in Washington.

General election

Candidates
 Matthew R. Abel (Green)
 Spencer Abraham, incumbent U.S. Senator (Republican)
 Michael Corliss (Libertarian)
 Mark Forton (Reform)
 John Mangopoulos (Constitution)
 William Quarton (Natural Law)
 Debbie Stabenow, U.S. Representative from East Lansing (Democratic)

Campaign
Abraham, who was first elected in the 1994 Republican Revolution despite never running for public office before, was considered vulnerable by the Democratic Senatorial Campaign Committee. Major issues in the campaign included prescription drugs for the elderly. By September 4, Abraham still had failed to reach 50% in polls despite having spent over $6 million on television ads. In mid-October, he came back and reached 50% and 49% in two polls respectively.

Debates
Complete video of debate, October 22, 2000

Results
The election was very close with Stabenow prevailing by just over 67,000 votes. Stabenow was also likely helped by the fact that Vice President Al Gore won Michigan in the concurrent presidential election. Ultimately, Stabenow pulled out huge numbers out of the Democratic stronghold of Wayne County, which covers the Detroit Metropolitan Area. Stabenow also performed well in other heavily populated areas such as Ingham County home to the state's capital of Lansing, and the college town of Ann Arbor. Abraham did not concede right after major news networks declared Stabenow the winner; he held out hope that the few outstanding precincts could push him over the edge. At 4:00 AM, Abraham conceded defeat. Senator Abraham called Stabenow and congratulated her on her victory. As a result of the historic election, Stabenow became the first woman to represent Michigan in the United States Senate.

See also 
 2000 United States Senate elections

References 

2000
Michigan
2000 Michigan elections